The Berry Cave salamander (Gyrinophilus gulolineatus) is a species of salamander in the family Plethodontidae, endemic to the Ridge-and-Valley Appalachians of eastern Tennessee in the United States.  Its natural habitat is inland karsts where it lives underground. It is threatened by habitat loss.

Description
This salamander resembles the Tennessee cave salamander (Gyrinophilus palleucus) but grows to a larger size, has a more spatulate snout, a broader head and more pigmentation. The premaxilla bones at the tip of the snout are completely divided in adults of this species while they are not in the Tennessee cave salamander. The larvae have small, functional eyes and they can detect vibrations in the water with the help of mechanoreceptors which are located on the head and sides. If they proceed to the full adult state, their eyes become functionless.

Distribution
This salamander is known from caves in the Ridge-and-Valley Appalachians of eastern Tennessee; its range is smaller than that of the spring salamander (Gyrinophilus porphyriticus) and is completely inside it, and the two species sometimes inhabit the same cave systems.

Biology
Phylogenetic analysis using nuclear and mitochondrial DNA seems to indicate that the Berry Cave salamander and the Tennessee cave salamander have diverged from the spring salamander only recently. The Berry Cave salamander is usually a paedomorphic species which does not undergo metamorphosis to an adult stage, instead remaining and breeding in the larval state, retaining its juvenile traits for the rest of its life.

Status
In the Berry Cave for which it was named, the population seems to be declining, and its population overall is unknown. The International Union for Conservation of Nature has rated its conservation status as "endangered" and advocates protection of the watersheds that drain into the underground systems in which it lives.

References

External links
 Distribution and relative abundance of Tennessee cave salamanders (Gyrinophilus palleucus and Gyrinophilus gulolineatus) with an emphasis on Tennessee populations 

Gyrinophilus
Cave salamanders
Amphibians of the United States
Endemic fauna of the United States
Taxonomy articles created by Polbot
Amphibians described in 1965